Masjid Hamza is a mosque and Islamic community center located at 200 Stuart Avenue, Valley Stream, New York. It has a K–6 school system called "Hamza Academy", and has a mosque. The masjid is located fifteen minutes away from John F. Kennedy International Airport and serves about 1,400 families. The masjid offers use of the masjid for the five daily prayers, adult and children's Quran classes, and Taraweeh in the month of Ramadan. The masjid originally started as a 2 bedroom house, but as a result of the growing Muslim community in Valley Stream, expanded to a bigger building in 2007. In a2015 annual fundraiser, the masjid announced plans for expansions, which they did by purchasing 3 adjacent properties

See also
  List of mosques in the Americas
  Lists of mosques 
  List of mosques in the United States

References

External links

Mosques in New York (state)
Valley Stream, New York